This is a list of the 100 largest counties in the United States by area. The list is based upon the total area of a county, both land and water surface, reported by the United States Census Bureau during the 2000 Census. Alaska is not divided into counties.

A different ranking becomes apparent when comparing county areas by land area alone as opposed to total area. Some counties, such as Keweenaw and Alger Counties in Michigan, include significant amounts of water in their total area and would not appear on a list that considered land area alone. This list also includes the four counties that would be included when water area is not included.

List of largest counties

Notes

Alaskan boroughs and census areas
Unlike most states, Alaska is divided into boroughs and census areas that serve as county-equivalents for the Census Bureau. If included with the remainder of the counties and county-equivalent areas in the United States, Alaska's boroughs and census areas would occupy the largest 11. Below is a list of these boroughs and census areas that would rank in the top 100 if included in the above list.

The Unorganized Borough, in which all of the census areas are located, is not considered a county-equivalent area and is not included in this list.

The rankings in the below list reflect the rank each borough or census area would have if included with all counties and county-equivalent areas in the United States (up to #11).

See also

References

Largest
Counties
United States Largest Counties
United States Largest Counties